"I'm Not a Vampire" is the third single from the debut album, The Drug in Me Is You, of the band Falling in Reverse. Like other songs on the album, Ronnie Radke wrote the song while incarcerated for parole violation, before the formation of Falling in Reverse.

Music video 
The music video was released on October 24, 2011 and parodied Celebrity Rehab with Dr. Drew, with Ronnie Radke checking himself into the fictionalized rehab while performing the song. Some of the figures parodied in the video included socialite and heiress Paris Hilton, drummer Tommy Lee, and fictional supernatural serial killer Jason Voorhees. Additionally, internet personality Jeffree Star appeared as an extra, sporting pink hair and large hoop earrings, visible at the 2:25 mark of the video.

Critical reception

About "I'm Not a Vampire", Loudwire said "On the track, frontman Ronnie Radke belts out an appealing chorus that will burrow in your head and linger there as he sings, 'I'm insane / Well, I can feel it in my bones / Coursing through my veins / When did I become so cold? / For goodness sake / Where is my self-control? / If home is where my heart is / Then my heart has lost all hope.' The song is complete with heavy guitar riffs and a serious guitar solo, plus soaring synthesizers along with crushingly upbeat drum patterns. Radke's hasty deliverance of witty lyrics makes this song a treat, as well [...] One of the best and humorous parts of the song is when Radke cleverly sings 'Hi, my name is Ronnie / I'm an addict / Daddy should’ve never raised me on Black Sabbath.'"

Revamped version
In February 2021 a new, revamped version accompanied by a cinematic music video Directed by Jensen Noen featuring Ronnie Radke as a vampire and Radke’s girlfriend Saraya Bevis (better known as former WWE star Paige) was released featuring a full orchestra, choir and piano, at the end of the music video features a tribute to guitarist Derek Jones. The new arrangement was composed by Irish composer Sean Rooney (The Drug in Me Is Reimagined). A full live chorus and various instruments were recorded in studio to further enhance the epic feel of the song. The track was produced by Tyler Smyth.

Personnel
Credits adapted from Tidal and YouTube.

Falling in Reverse
 Ronnie Radke – lead vocals, songwriting, composer
 Jacky Vincent – lead guitar, backing vocals
 Derek Jones – rhythm guitar, backing vocals
 Nason Schoeffler – bass, backing vocals (uncredited performance)
 Scott Gee – drums, percussion, backing vocals (uncredited performance)
 Mika Horiuchi – bass, backing vocals (only appears in credits and music video)
 Ryan Seaman – drums, percussion, backing vocals (only appears in credits and music video)
Additional personnel
 Michael 'Elvis' Baskette – producer, songwriting, composer
 David Holdredge – mixing, engineer, songwriting, composer

Revamped personnel
Falling in Reverse
 Ronnie Radke – lead vocals, producer, programming
Additional personnel
 Tyler Smyth – producer
 Tony Maserati – mixing
 Sean Rooney – piano, composition
 Russell Jackson – additional vocals producer
 Michael "Elvis" Baskette – songwriting
 Dave Holdredge – songwriting
Additional musicians
 Sean Rooney – piano
 Chase Matthews – choir vocals
 Christopher Aaron – choir vocals
 Donna Taylor – choir vocals
 George Steeves – choir vocals
 Jackie Simley – choir vocals
 Jacob Lusk – choir vocals
 Kelly Jones – choir vocals
 Kym Foley – choir vocals
 Leah Williams – choir vocals
 Marcellina Hawthorne – choir vocals
 Mike Sandberg – choir vocals
 Mikel Cole – choir vocals
 Neeyah Lynn Rose – choir vocals
 Phillip Hunter – choir vocals
 Russell Jackson – choir vocals
 Sire James – choir vocals 
 Terry Marcheta Nicholson – choir vocals
 Ronee Martin – choir vocals
 Vickie Dove – choir vocals
 Zuri – choir vocals

Awards

Release history

References

2011 songs
Falling in Reverse songs
Songs written by Ronnie Radke
Songs written by Michael Baskette
Song recordings produced by Michael Baskette
Cultural depictions of Paris Hilton
Epitaph Records singles